Charlotte West was a provincial electoral district for the Legislative Assembly of New Brunswick, Canada; it existed from 1974 to 1995.

It was created from part of the former four-member electoral district of Charlotte during the New Brunswick electoral redistribution of 1973. In the New Brunswick electoral redistribution of 1994, parts of Charlotte West were merged with St. Stephen-Milltown to form the new electoral division of Western Charlotte; the remainder became part of the new electoral district of Fundy Isles.

Members of the Legislative Assembly

Election results

External links 
Website of the Legislative Assembly of New Brunswick

Former provincial electoral districts of New Brunswick